Sara Madruga da Costa (born 1978) is a Portuguese lawyer and politician. A member of the Social Democratic Party (PSD), she represents the Autonomous Region of Madeira in the Assembly of the Republic of Portugal.

Early life
Sara Martins Marques dos Santos Madruga da Costa was born in Madeira on 15 September 1978. She graduated in Law from the Faculty of Law of the University of Lisbon and did a postgraduate degree in Law on Spatial Planning, Urbanism and Environment from the Faculty of Law of the University of Coimbra. She is continuing to study at the Lisbon university. She began working as a lawyer in 2003, mainly covering the area of real estate. More recently, she has taught a course at the Instituto Superior de Administração e Línguas (Higher Institute of Administration and Languages - ISAL) in Madeira. She is married to Carlos Eduardo Pereira Madruga da Costa.

Political career
Madruga da Costa's political career began in 2009 when she became a member of the Santo António Parish Assembly in Funchal, capital of Madeira. In early 2015 she became a member of the Regional Legislative Assembly of Madeira, where she played a prominent role in the amendment to the Rules of Procedure of the Assembly. Six months later she was elected on the PSD list of candidates to represent Madeira in the Assembly of the Republic of Portugal. She was re-elected in 2019. She is on several parliamentary committees, including that on constitutional affairs, rights, freedoms and guarantees and is coordinator of a Working Group on the conditions of work of Portugal's security forces. She is a Vice-President of the PSD Parliamentary Group in the Assembly.

References

1978 births
Living people
Members of the Assembly of the Republic (Portugal)
Women members of the Assembly of the Republic (Portugal)
Social Democratic Party (Portugal) politicians
University of Lisbon alumni
University of Coimbra alumni
People from Madeira